Acropora striata is a species of acroporid coral found in the southwest Indian Ocean, the central Indo-Pacific, Japan and the East China Sea. It can also be found in the Marshall Islands, the Society Islands, the Cook Islands, Kiribati, the Solomon Islands, western and eastern Australia, the Great Barrier Reef, Palau, the south Mariana Islands and Pohnpei. It probably spawns in October and was described by Verrill in 1866.

Taxonomy
It was originally described as Madrepora striata by Verrill in 1866.

Description
It occurs in colonies composed of short branches. It has small axial corallites and its radial corallites have no defined shape or size. It is grey-brown in colour and branches have white tips. It looks similar to Acropora parahemprichii and Acropora sekiseiensis.

Distribution
It is classed as a vulnerable species on the IUCN Red List and it is believed that its population is decreasing; the species is also listed under Appendix II of CITES. Figures of its population are unknown, but is likely to be threatened by the global reduction of coral reefs, the increase of temperature causing coral bleaching, climate change, human activity, the crown-of-thorns starfish and disease. It occurs in the southwest Indian Ocean, the central Indo-Pacific, Japan and the East China Sea; it also occurs in the Marshall Islands, the Society Islands, the Cook Islands, Kiribati, the Solomon Islands, western and eastern Australia, the Great Barrier Reef, Palau, the south Mariana Islands and Pohnpei.

References

Acropora
Corals described in 1866
Vulnerable animals